By Design is a 1982 Canadian comedy-drama film.

By Design may also refer to:
By Design: A Hollywood Novel, a novel by Richard E. Grant
 By Design, an album by  Design
 “By Design”, a song by Kid Cudi from the album Passion, Pain & Demon Slayin'